Aleksei Aleksandrovich Paramonov (21 February 1925 – 24 August 2018) was a Soviet football player and manager, 1956 Olympic champion. He was born in Borovsk.

Biography
Paramonov and his wife Yulia Vasilievna were married from 1950 until his death and had a daughter. In 2016 Yulia Paramonova died. Aleksei died at a hospital in Moscow from a brief illness on 24 August 2018, aged 93.

Awards

Government 
 Order  For Merit to the Fatherland 4th class (1999)
 Order of Honour (2005)
 Order of Friendship (1997)
 Order of the Badge of Honour (1957) 
 Honored Master of Sports of the USSR (1953)
 Veteran of Labour (1985)
 Honorary Citizen of Borovsk (2008)

Sports 
 Olympic Order (2001)
 Ruby Order of UEFA (2001)
 Order of FIFA For Merit (2006)

References

External links
  Profile

1925 births
2018 deaths
People from Borovsky District
Russian footballers
Soviet footballers
Soviet Union international footballers
Soviet football managers
Soviet Top League players
FC Spartak Moscow players
Olympic footballers of the Soviet Union
Footballers at the 1956 Summer Olympics
Olympic gold medalists for the Soviet Union
Étoile Sportive du Sahel managers
Olympic medalists in football
Medalists at the 1956 Summer Olympics
Recipients of the Order of Honour (Russia)
Honoured Masters of Sport of the USSR
Recipients of the Olympic Order
Russian expatriate football managers
Expatriate football managers in Tunisia
Russian expatriate sportspeople in Tunisia
Burials at Vagankovo Cemetery
Association football forwards
Sportspeople from Kaluga Oblast